Bishop Anstey High School East (BAHSE) is an all-girls secondary school in Trinidad and Tobago. BAHSE is located in Trincity on College Avenue. The school's motto is "Selflessly Serving Our Community", with their patron saint, St. Clare, in mind. The school uniform consists of a white blouse, a striped tie containing the colours red, gold and navy blue, a navy blue skirt, white socks, black shoes and the school badge. Although it is recently established the school is considered one of the most prestigious schools in Trinidad and Tobago.  This school believes that education is not only about academics but about sports and the arts as well.

School prayer
O God whose blessed Son became poor
that we through his poverty might be rich:
Deliver us, we pray thee, from an inordinate love of this world,
that inspired by the devotion of thy servant Clare,
we may serve thee with singleness of heart,
and attain to the riches of the age to come;
through Jesus Christ our Lord, who liveth with thee,
in the unity of The Holy Spirit,
one God, now and forever.
Amen.

Subjects
Art  
Graphic Arts
Visual Arts
Technical Drawing
Theatre Arts
Business
Principles of Accounts
Principles of Business
English
English A
Literature (English-B)
Foreign Languages
French
Spanish
Technology
Information Technology
Technology Education
Library
Information Literacy Skills
Mathematics
Mathematics
Advanced Subsidiary Mathematics
Economics
Music
Music
Sciences
Agricultural Sciences
Integrated Science
Chemistry
Physics
Biology
Social Sciences
Geography
Social Studies
History
Business
Accounts
Economics
Religion
Religious Education
Physical/Health Class
Physical and Health Science/Education

Extra curricular activities
Archery
Robotics
Basketball
Choir
Cricket
Drama
Folk/ Ballroom Dancing
Football
Hockey
Karate
Netball
Pan
Photography
Swimming
Tennis
Track and Field
Volleyball
Board Games Club
President's Award Trinidad

School song
 "We Are One"

Verse 1
Oh Lord you sent your love into this world for us to keep
We cherish ever moment you have given us eyes to see
We ask that you would make us strong withstanding ever sin
To walk within the footsteps
Of our saviour and our King

Chorus
Cause we are one
Selflessly serving our community
We are one
Standing side by side in unity
With dedication and sacrifice
Like the one who knew no sin
We at Bishop and Trinity East
Good cheer and tidings bring
Cause we are one

Verse 2
We praise our exemplars
Role models, one and all
Attending to our needs and answering when duty calls
We are not divided
Great guidance is assured
Striving towards excellence
We cannot ask for more

Chorus

Verse 3
Together we aspire to achieve our very best
One goal and one objective
We will pass every test
As we walk throughout life's journey with strength in every hand
Great blessings sent from God above
We'll spread throughout the land

Chorus

External links
 Official website

Schools in Trinidad and Tobago
Educational institutions established in 2001
2001 establishments in Trinidad and Tobago